Liu Xiaoning (born  in Qingdao, Shandong) is a Chinese former volleyball player, a member of the China women's national volleyball team from 1995 to 2001. She was part of the Chinese national team, the silver medalist at the 1996 Summer Olympics in Atlanta, the United States.

References

1975 births
Living people
Volleyball players from Qingdao
Chinese women's volleyball players
Olympic silver medalists for China
Olympic medalists in volleyball
Volleyball players at the 1996 Summer Olympics
Medalists at the 1996 Summer Olympics
20th-century Chinese women